Sergio Alberto Ahumada Bacho (born 2 October 1948) is a retired Chilean footballer, who played for Deportes La Serena, Colo-Colo, Tecos, Unión Española, among others clubs.

International career
He earned 29 caps and scored 6 goals for the Chile national football team, and scored the only Chilean goal in the 1974 FIFA World Cup in a 1–1 draw against East Germany.

Honours
Colo-Colo
 Primera División (2): 1970, 1972

Unión Española
 Primera División (1): 1975

Everton
 Primera División (1): 1976

References

External links

Profile 
International caps

1948 births
Living people
People from Coquimbo
Chilean footballers
Chilean expatriate footballers
Chile international footballers
1974 FIFA World Cup players
1975 Copa América players
Deportes La Serena footballers
San Antonio Unido footballers
Colo-Colo footballers
Unión Española footballers
Tecos F.C. footballers
Everton de Viña del Mar footballers
O'Higgins F.C. footballers
Coquimbo Unido footballers
Chilean Primera División players
Primera B de Chile players
Liga MX players
Chilean expatriate sportspeople in Mexico
Expatriate footballers in Mexico
Association football forwards